Counting Heads is a science fiction novel by American writer David Marusek, published in 2005 by Tor Books.

Counting Heads is an expansion of Marusek's 1995 short story "We Were Out of Our Minds with Joy", which serves as the first chapter of Counting Heads (with minor revisions from its original rendition as a short story).

Mind Over Ship, a sequel to Counting Heads, was released on January 20, 2009.

Analysis
The extended story from We Were Out of Our Minds with Joy, happening in 2092-4, occupies the first part of the novel. The other two parts are set 40 years later, in 2134.

Though the novel is a murder/espionage mystery, the main thrust is the evocation of a world in which the individual is essentially obsolete due to automation.

References

External links

New York Times: It's All Geek to Me
Amazon.com Page
Curledup Book Review

2005 novels
Novels by David Marusek
2005 science fiction novels
Fiction set in the 2090s
Novels set in the 22nd century
Tor Books books